The Clerget 11Eb was an 11-cylinder rotary aircraft engine of the World War I era designed by Pierre Clerget. Powering Sopwith types it was nominally rated at 200 horsepower (150 kW).

Applications
Sopwith Bulldog
Sopwith Hippo
Sopwith Salamander

Specifications (Clerget 11Eb)

See also

References

Notes

Bibliography

 Gunston, Bill. World Encyclopaedia of Aero Engines. Cambridge, England. Patrick Stephens Limited, 1989. 
 Lumsden, Alec. British Piston Engines and their Aircraft. Marlborough, Wiltshire: Airlife Publishing, 2003. .

Air-cooled aircraft piston engines
1910s aircraft piston engines
11Eb
Rotary aircraft piston engines